JD & The Straight Shot (also promoted as JD and the Straight Shot) is the country blues and roots rock vanity project of its frontman and guitarist, Cablevision Systems Corporation CEO and Madison Square Garden Company Executive Chairman James L. Dolan.

Because of his corporate status and his friendship and business relationship with entertainment executive Irving Azoff, Dolan has been able to leverage JD & The Straight Shot onto shows by The Eagles, The Allman Brothers Band, ZZ Top, Jewel, Keith Urban, the Dixie Chicks, Joe Walsh and Robert Randolph. Attendance by Madison Square Garden staff employees "is expected and noted" when the group plays at New York clubs. The group's song "Can't Make Tears" was on the soundtrack for the TV show Hell on Wheels on the cable channel AMC, which is controlled by Dolan and his family. The group's music has also been featured in films including Hurricane Season, August: Osage County, and Butter, all of which were produced by The Weinstein Company, a corporate business partner of Dolan's Madison Square Garden Company.  The group's fifth album Ballyhoo! sold only 113 copies in the first four months after its January 2016 release. The group's sixth album, Good Luck and Good Night, was released on September 15, 2017.

The New York Times has described the band as a group of "well-known sidemen backing a karaoke grade singer," and noted that Dolan's "musical talents are unlikely to endanger his day job."  After the group's performance opening for ZZ Top, one reviewer wrote that Dolan's "enthusiasm for playing mediocre American rock did little to make their forgettable performance entertaining." After a 2017 show in New York City, another reviewer observed that Dolan "sings like he's trying not to cough, and it's possible he can't play the guitar. Worse, his songs belie his status as a cosplaying bluesman; most of his lyrics simply summarize current events or books that he's read as if he were presenting a 10th grade English class project."

Discography

Studio albums
Nothing to Hide (2005)
Right On Time (2008)
Can't Make Tears (2011)
Where I've Been (2014)
Ballyhoo! (2016)
Good Luck and Good Night (2017)
The Great Divide (2019)

References

External links
 Official website
 
 

American blues musical groups
Musical groups from New York City